Yunusa Abubakar is a politician representing Yamaltu-Deba Constituency in the House of Representatives of Nigeria.

Early life and education 
Hon. Abubakar is an indigene of Yalmatu/Deba Local Government Area of Gombe State. He studied at the Government Secondary School in Kaltungo, Gombe State, and received her General Certificate of Education in 1977.  He continued to the polytechnic, where he earned an HND in electrical engineering in 1990.

Politics 
In 2002, he was elected as a Member of the Gombe State House of Assembly representing Yamaltu-Deba from 2000 to 2003. He was chosen in 2015 to serve as the National Assembly representative for the Yamaltu-Deba Federal Constituency on the APC platform.

Reference 

People from Gombe State
Politicians from Gombe State
1959 births
Gombe State Senate elections
Gombe State House of Representatives elections
Living people